The 2007 Nigerian Senate election in Ogun State was held on 21 April 2007, to elect members of the Nigerian Senate to represent Ogun State. Iyabo Obasanjo representing Ogun Central and Ramoni Mustapha representing Ogun East won on the platform of Peoples Democratic Party, while Felix Bajomo representing Ogun West won on the platform of the Action Congress.

Overview

Summary

Results

Ogun Central 
The election was won by Iyabo Obasanjo of the Peoples Democratic Party.

Lagos East 
The election was won by Ramoni Mustapha of the Peoples Democratic Party.

Ogun West 
The election was won by Felix Bajomo of the Action Congress.

References 

April 2007 events in Nigeria
Ogun State Senate elections
Ogo